Wrestle Association R (formerly known as Wrestle and Romance and abbreviated as WAR) was a Japanese professional wrestling promotion founded and run by Genichiro Tenryu as the successor to Super World of Sports, and which lasted from 1992 to 2000. The promotion initially established as Wrestle and Romance in 1992, had very few regular contracted workers, instead most of the workers were either freelance or employed in other promotions. Because of this WAR ran many all-star cards. It had inter-promotional feuds against New Japan Pro-Wrestling, Frontier Martial-Arts Wrestling, the new Tokyo Pro Wrestling, and UWF International. WAR also continued, albeit in a loose fashion, SWS's old working agreement with the World Wrestling Federation, when they backed the WWF's first Japanese tour, in 1994.

On July 28, 1995, WAR was renamed "Wrestle Association R" at a show held in the Korakuen Hall. In 1998, WAR cancelled contracts to the roster and began running fewer and fewer events due to Tenryu's comeback in New Japan, and in July 2000, it promoted a farewell show that served as the prelude to Tenryu's return to All Japan Pro Wrestling (many wrestlers from WAR also joined AJPW to fill the void by those who joined Mitsuharu Misawa in forming Pro Wrestling Noah). The WAR name was kept for the use of a stable led by Tenryu during brief angles in All Japan and FMW in 2001.

On July 27, 2006, WAR staged a reunion show at Tokyo Korakuen Hall. The show was supported by various Japanese wrestling promotions including New Japan, All Japan Pro Wrestling and Dragon Gate. This was also the final card promoted under the WAR banner.

WAR was the first promotion to create a steady junior heavyweight tag team title long before New Japan Pro-Wrestling, WCW, and Pro Wrestling Noah hit upon the idea.

In 2010, the Tenryu Project was organised, and is somewhat of a successor to WAR.

Championships

J-1 Heavyweight Championship

This title used the championship belt originally used in the 1950s by the old Japan Pro Wrestling Alliance for their JWA Japanese Heavyweight Championship, held throughout its existence by Rikidōzan.

Other titles
WAR International Junior Heavyweight Championship
WAR International Junior Heavyweight Tag Team Championship
WAR World Six-Man Tag Team Championship

Alumni
These are not exhaustive lists. Guest Japanese wrestlers from other promotions, such as Nobuhiko Takada from UWF International and The Great Sasuke from Michinoku Pro Wrestling, are not listed.

Notable events

WAR/WWF
An inter-promotional show between WAR and the World Wrestling Federation was held on September 15, 1992, at the Yokohama Arena in Yokohama, Kanagawa, Japan.

WAR Anniversary Show

WAR Anniversary Show was the flagship event of WAR which was used to celebrate the anniversary of the promotion. The event was held between 1993 and 2000, when the promotion was discontinued.

WAR/LLPW
An inter-promotional event featuring talent from WAR and Ladies Legend Pro-Wrestling was held on November 28, 1993, at the Sumo Hall in Tokyo, Japan.

Revolution
Revolution was a special event held on December 15, 1993, at the Sumo Hall in Tokyo, Japan.

Revolution Rumble '94 In Ryogoku Kokugikan

Revolution Rumble '94 In Ryogoku Kokugikan was a special event held on March 2, 1994, at the Ryōgoku Kokugikan in Tokyo, Japan. The event was notable for an inter-promotional tag team main event match in which Genichiro Tenryu and Ashura Hara represented WAR against Frontier Martial-Arts Wrestling's Atsushi Onita and Tarzan Goto. Onita pinned Tenryu and the match set up a major main event between Tenryu and Onita for FMW's 5th Anniversary Show at the Kawasaki Stadium on May 5, 1994.

Super J-Cup

Super J-Cup is a professional wrestling tournament featuring junior heavyweight wrestlers from all over the world. The tournament was originally conceived by Japanese wrestler Jushin Thunder Liger as a showcase for junior heavyweights from promotions from Asia and North America on a national level. WAR hosted the second edition of the tournament on December 13, 1995, at the Sumo Hall in Tokyo, Japan.

WAR vs. UWFI: Super Summer Wars
An inter-promotional event featuring wrestlers from WAR and UWFI, among other promotions as well. The event took place a day after the 4th Anniversary Show on July 21, 1996, at the Sumo Hall in Tokyo, Japan.

Final - Reborn to Future
Final - Reborn to Future was a reunion event of WAR after the promotion had closed down in 2000 and marked the final event ever in WAR history. The event took place on July 27, 2006, at the Korakuen Hall in Tokyo, Japan. The event aired via tape delay on Gaora TV on August 17. The event featured a title defense of the WAR International Junior Heavyweight Championship which had been in possession of Masaaki Mochizuki since WAR closed in 2000 and the main event was an eight-man tag team match, in which WAR wrestlers took on Heisei Ishingun.

See also

WAR tournaments
Professional wrestling in Japan

References

External links
Wrestling-Titles.com

 
1992 establishments in Japan
Japanese professional wrestling promotions
Organizations disestablished in 2000